Reginald Brabazon, 12th Earl of Meath,  (31 July 1841 – 11 October 1929) was an Irish politician and philanthropist.

Life
The Honourable Reginald Brabazon was born into an old Anglo-Irish family in London, the second son of William Brabazon, 11th Earl of Meath and Harriot Brooke. When his father succeeded to the Earldom in 1851, Reginald, now the heir (his elder brother, Jacques, died of diphtheria in 1844), was styled Lord Brabazon. He was educated at Eton College and in 1863 he became a clerk in the Foreign Office.

In 1868 he married Lady Mary Jane Maitland, daughter of the 11th Earl of Lauderdale. Brabazon served as a diplomat abroad but he refused to go to Athens in 1873 to please his in-laws. He was given no alternative posting and while still suspended he resigned in 1877. He and his wife did not need to work so they decided to deal with "social problems and the relief of human suffering". His charities included the Metropolitan Public Gardens Association which he founded in 1882. The association created public parks and gardens in London. The Earl and his wife leased Ottershaw Park from 1882 to November 1883 from Sir Edward Colebrooke. He was High Sheriff of Wicklow in 1883.

In May 1887, Brabazon succeeded his father as 12th Earl of Meath. Lord Meath was also a prominent Conservative politician in the House of Lords as Baron Chaworth, and an ardent imperialist, and was responsible for the introduction of Empire Day, which was recognised by the British government in 1916. He was a member of the London County Council, the Privy Council of Ireland and the Senate of Southern Ireland. He was also Chief Scout Commissioner for Ireland.

In December 1902 he was appointed Chancellor of the Royal University of Ireland, serving as such until 1906.

Lord Meath was appointed Knight of the Order of St Patrick (KP) in 1902, Knight Grand Cross of the Order of the British Empire (GBE) in the 1920 civilian war honours, and Knight Grand Cross of the Royal Victorian Order (GCVO) in the 1923 Birthday Honours.

His younger daughter, Lady Violet Constance Maitland Brabazon (1886–1936), married the 4th Earl of Verulam.

There is a Portland stone memorial (executed by the artist Joseph Hermon Cawthra in 1934) in his honour, bearing a small portrait panel in bas-relief, outside the Columbia Hotel in Lancaster Gate, London W2. Recordings of his voice exist made in October 1910, in the form of three speeches on the Empire Movement.

Lord Meath is buried in the graveyard of the Church of Ireland parish church in the small village of Delgany, County Wicklow, Ireland, along with his wife and son. There are some streets and squares in The Coombe, Dublin, named in his honour: Reginald Street, Reginald Square and Brabazon Square. Meath Gardens in Bethnal Green, opened as a public park in 1894 through the efforts of the Metropolitan Public Gardens Association, is named in his honour.

Gallery

Footnotes

References
Biography, Oxford Dictionary of National Biography
Obituary, The Times, 12 October 1929

External links
 

1841 births
1929 deaths
Members of HM Diplomatic Service
British philanthropists
Conservative Party (UK) hereditary peers
High Sheriffs of Wicklow
Irish unionists
Knights Grand Cross of the Order of the British Empire
Knights Grand Cross of the Royal Victorian Order
Knights of St Patrick
Members of the Privy Council of Ireland
Members of London County Council
People educated at Eton College
People from Belgravia
Members of the Senate of Southern Ireland
Reginald
12
Irish knights